Miguel Ángel Jiménez Rodríguez (born 5 January 1964) is a Spanish professional golfer. He has won 21 times on the European Tour and has been a member of two victorious Ryder Cup teams.

Early years
Born in Málaga in southern Spain, Jiménez first played on the European Tour in 1988 and improved steadily over the next few seasons. His first win on the tour came at the Piaget Belgian Open in 1992. During a fairly up and down career, he has so far had four main periods of success. He has finished inside the top 100 on the European Tour Order of Merit every season since 1989. In 1994 he finished fifth on the European Tour Order of Merit. One highlight was scoring an exceptionally rare albatross (double eagle) on the 17th hole at Valderrama, during the 1994 Volvo Masters, sinking his second shot on the par-5 hole with a 3-iron.

After some weaker seasons he bounced back in 1998 and 1999, finishing fourth on the Order of Merit in consecutive years and winning four tournaments including the prestigious Volvo Masters. In 1999 he also came second in the WGC-American Express Championship, which is one of the elite World Golf Championships events, and made his Ryder Cup debut.

Career since 2000
In 2004, Jiménez once again bounced back from some modest seasons, notching up another fourth-place finish on the Order of Merit, and winning four European Tour events, which was more than any other player. He maintained his form into 2005, winning the Omega Hong Kong Open, which is a European Tour event, and the Celtic Manor Wales Open. He has featured in the top 20 of the Official World Golf Rankings. Jiménez has had great success in team events representing Europe and Spain, winning the Alfred Dunhill Cup in 1999 and 2000, the Seve Trophy in 2000 and the Ryder Cup in 2004 and 2010.

In 2005, Jiménez won the Spanish Pairs final, with Andrés Jiménez at La Cala Resort in Andalucia, Spain.

2008 proved to be another good season with two wins, including the BMW PGA Championship at Wentworth, in which he beat Oliver Wilson in a play-off. His form earned Jiménez a spot on the 2008 Ryder Cup team. He finished the season ranked fourth on the Order of Merit once more.

While defending his BMW PGA Championship title in 2009, Jiménez scored a rare albatross (double eagle) by holing a  six-iron on his second shot on the par-five fourth. It was the second such feat of his competitive career.

In February 2010, Jiménez won the Omega Dubai Desert Classic, beating Lee Westwood in a playoff and in July added the Alstom Open de France, beating Alejandro Cañizares and Francesco Molinari on the first hole of a playoff. He won his third event of the year at the Omega European Masters, finishing three strokes ahead of Edoardo Molinari

Jiménez was named as Europe's fourth assistant captain for the Ryder Cup in 2012. Later in 2012 he won his 19th European Tour event at the UBS Hong Kong Open, and in doing so became the oldest ever winner on the European Tour.

While skiing in southern Spain on 29 December 2012, Jiménez fell and suffered a right tibial plateau fracture, which required surgery and kept him out of competition for several months. He played in the Open de España in April 2013 but missed the cut and returned to the European Tour in late May. In July, Jiménez was the 36-hole leader at The Open Championship. Later that summer, he lost a playoff to Joost Luiten at the KLM Open. In December 2013 Jiménez retained his Hong Kong Open title and broke his own record as the European Tour's oldest winner.

On 18 April 2014, Jiménez made his Champions Tour debut by shooting a course record 65 at the Greater Gwinnett Championship. Jiménez went on to win the tournament by two shots over Bernhard Langer.

Exactly one month later, Jiménez again extended his record as the then oldest winner on the European Tour at 50 years and 133 days. By winning, he secured his first triumph in the Open de España in his 27th time appearance at the event. Jiménez's up-and-down par on the first playoff hole defeated Richard Green and Thomas Pieters. The win was Jiménez's 14th since turning 40 and tied him for 10th  all-time among golfers with the most European Tour victories. His record as the oldest winner on tour was eventually broken by Phil Mickelson who won the 2021 PGA Championship at 50 years and 341 days.

In January 2015, Jiménez won his second Champions Tour event at the  Mitsubishi Electric Championship at Hualalai. On 23 May 2015, Jiménez aced the par-3 second hole during the BMW PGA Championship at the Wentworth Club, his tenth hole-in-one on the European Tour, which broke the record he jointly held with Colin Montgomerie. The ace was Jiménez's third of the season. He went on to finish joint second in the tournament.

In April 2016, Jiménez won for the third time on the Champions Tour, with a two-stroke victory at the Mississippi Gulf Resort Classic over Scott Dunlap. In April 2017, Jiménez repeated as champion at the Mississippi Gulf Resort Classic.

In May 2018, Jiménez won a major title on the PGA Tour Champions by winning the Regions Tradition. In July 2018, Jiménez won another major title on the PGA Tour Champions by winning the Senior Open Championship at the Old Course at St Andrews.

On 17 February 2019, Jiménez won the Chubb Classic on the PGA Tour Champions, with a playoff victory over Bernhard Langer and Olin Browne. This victory was his 7th career title on the PGA Tour Champions. On 21 October 2019, Jiménez won the Dominion Energy Charity Classic on the PGA Tour Champions. He won with a final round of 63.

On 19 January 2020, Jiménez won the season-opening Mitsubishi Electric Championship at Hualalai on the PGA Tour Champions over Ernie Els and Fred Couples in a sudden death playoff. 

At the 2020 Hero Open, Jiménez passed Sam Torrance for most starts on the European Tour, with 707.

On 22 January 2022, Jiménez won the season-opening Mitsubishi Electric Championship at Hualalai on the PGA Tour Champions for a third time. Jiménez won over Steven Alker in a sudden death playoff.

On 27 February 2022, Jiménez won the Cologuard Classic in Arizona on PGA Tour Champions. This marked his second win in three events. Jiménez made two holes-in-one in the three round tournament.

Personal
Jiménez is known as "The Mechanic" despite his preference for driving, rather than repairing, high-performance vehicles, especially his red Ferrari.

After the winner's press conference following the 2014 Open de España, Jiménez was asked the secret of his longevity. He stated, "There is no secret. Good food, good wine, good cigars and some exercise!"

Professional wins (41)

European Tour wins (21)

*Note: The 2003 Turespaña Mallorca Classic was shortened to 54 holes due to weather.
1Dual-ranking event with the Challenge Tour
2Co-sanctioned by the Asian Tour
3Co-sanctioned by the PGA Tour of Australasia

European Tour playoff record (5–3)

Asian Tour wins (7)

1Co-sanctioned by the European Tour
2Co-sanctioned by the PGA Tour of Australasia

Asian Tour playoff record (1–0)

Other wins (7)
1988 Open de l'Informatique (France)
1989 Benson & Hedges Trophy (with Xonia Wunsch-Ruiz)
1999 Oki Telepizza – Olivia Nova (Spain)
1999 Spanish Professional Closed Championship
2002 Spanish Professional Closed Championship
2003 Spanish Professional Closed Championship
2006 Spanish Professional Closed Championship

PGA Tour Champions wins (13)

PGA Champions Tour playoff record (4–3)

European Senior Tour wins (1)

European Senior Tour playoff record (0–1)

Playoff record
PGA Tour playoff record (0–1)

Results in major championships

 

CUT = missed the half-way cut
DQ = Disqualified
"T" = tied

Summary

Most consecutive cuts made – 6 (1999 PGA – 2001 Masters)
Longest streak of top-10s – 2 (twice)

Results in The Players Championship

CUT = missed the halfway cut
"T" indicates a tie for a place

Results in World Golf Championships
Results not in chronological order before 2015.

1Cancelled due to 9/11

QF, R16, R32, R64 = Round in which player lost in match play
"T" = Tied
NT = No tournament
Note that the HSBC Champions did not become a WGC event until 2009.

Senior major championships

Wins (2)

Results timeline
Results not in chronological order before 2022.

CUT = missed the halfway cut
"T" indicates a tie for a place
NT = No tournament due to COVID-19 pandemic

Team appearances
Alfred Dunhill Cup (representing Spain): 1990, 1992, 1993, 1994, 1995, 1996, 1997, 1998, 1999 (winners), 2000 (winners)
World Cup (representing Spain): 1990, 1992, 1993, 1994, 2000, 2001, 2003, 2004, 2005, 2006, 2007, 2008, 2011, 2013
Ryder Cup (representing Europe): 1999, 2004 (winners), 2008, 2010 (winners)
Seve Trophy (representing Continental Europe): 2000 (winners), 2002, 2003, 2005, 2007, 2009, 2011, 2013 (winners)
Royal Trophy (representing Europe): 2012
EurAsia Cup (representing Europe): 2014 (playing captain)

See also
List of golfers with most European Tour wins
List of golfers with most Asian Tour wins
List of golfers with most PGA Tour Champions wins

References

External links

Spanish male golfers
European Tour golfers
PGA Tour golfers
PGA Tour Champions golfers
Winners of senior major golf championships
Ryder Cup competitors for Europe
Sportspeople from Málaga
1964 births
Living people